Alois Lunzer (1840–??), was an Austrian-born watercolour painter, who emigrated to Philadelphia and specialised in doing botanical illustrations.

Lunzer collaborated with Thomas Meehan, botanist and author, and Louis Prang, publisher, in producing “The Native Flowers and Ferns of the United States” (1879).

External links

“The Native Flowers and Ferns of the United States”
Brown Brothers Company; Lunzer, Alois (Ill.): Trees and plants for the world out of doors, 1909

Botanical illustrators
19th-century Austrian painters
Austrian male painters
1840 births
Year of death missing
19th-century Austrian male artists